Kallar Kahar Tehsil (in Punjabi and Urdu تحصِيل كلّر كہار), is an administrative subdivision (tehsil) of Chakwal District in the Punjab province of Pakistan. Tehsil headquarters are in Kallar Kahar city. 

The area is also known for its peacocks and a salt water natural lake. One of the reputed cadet colleges is also stationed in this town. Population in Kallar Kahar town is 24,283 per the 2017 census.

References

Chakwal District
Tehsils of Punjab, Pakistan